Maureen de Lange (born 25 October 1978) is a Dutch short track speed skater. She competed in the women's 3000 metre relay event at the 1998 Winter Olympics.

References

External links
 

1978 births
Living people
Dutch female short track speed skaters
Olympic short track speed skaters of the Netherlands
Short track speed skaters at the 1998 Winter Olympics
People from Leiderdorp
Sportspeople from South Holland